Ilf and Petrov Rode a Tram ( is a 1972 Soviet comedy film directed by Viktor Titov.

Plot
The film is a series of short comedies, based on humorous anecdotes, stories and notebooks of famous satirist writers Ilya Ilf and Yevgeny Petrov. These comedies describe the everyday life of Moscow and in the 1920s and 1930s; the film uses a lot of newsreels of the time.

Comedy's subjects are various as life itself. For example, a clerk named Kapitulov is constantly scaring his wife and colleagues with his poor health. As a result, all the household chores is shouldered on his wife, and his colleagues at work do all Kapitulov's duties, while he sleeps nearby, sitting on a chair ...

Cast

 Innokenty Smoktunovsky as tramway passenger
 Vladimir Basov as tramway passenger
 Svetlana Starikova as tramway passenger
 Emmanuil Geller as tramway passenger
 Nicholas Gorlov as tramway passenger
 Elena Volsky as check-taker
 Yevgeny Leonov as Vitaly Kapitulov
 Nina Agapova as Vera, Kapitulov's wife
 Nikholay Grabbe as chief editor of newspaper
 Grigory Shpigel as employee of the newspaper
 Olga Gobzeva as typewriter
 Mikhail Gluzsky as accountant Brykin
 Ivan Ryzhov as chief editor of newspaper «Fising»'''
 Zinovy Gerdt as Captain Mazuchcho, animal trainer Arkady Zinman as director of circus Lidiya Smirnova as handler and artistic director of circus Vladimir Grammatikov as Ussishkin, commissioner of circus Nicholas Dostal as commissioner of circus Nina Alisova as Vasilisa Aleksandrovna, secretary Vyacheslav Gostinsky as circus ringmaster Igor Yasulovich as Vasya the sculptor / Hans the sculptor Svetlana Danilchenko as girl in a beret Rolan Bykov as Ivan S. Fedorenko Lev Durov as passerby / Gusev-Lebedev Michaela Drozdovskaya as nurse Yevgeny Morgunov as robber Valery Nosik as Kipyatkov Rudolf Rudin as visitor to the cafe Jacob Lenz as visitor to the cafe Oleg Tabakov as voice-over''

References

External links

1972 films
Films directed by Viktor Titov
1972 comedy films
Soviet comedy films
Russian comedy films